Aechmea abbreviata is a species of plant in the family Bromeliaceae. It is endemic to Ecuador. Its natural habitat is subtropical or tropical moist lowland forests.

References

abbreviata
Endemic flora of Ecuador
Least concern plants
Taxonomy articles created by Polbot
Plants described in 1959